

References 

History of Pomerania